Bite registration is taking an impression of a patient's upper and lower teeth in the bite position to assist in the making and fitting of crowns, dentures, mouthguards, etc.. An impression may be produced by biting onto a thin sheet of color-coated foil ("articulating paper"), leaving colored marks on the tooth surface where upper and lower teeth make contact, or a deeper, three-dimensional impression can be made by biting into wax, polysiloxane or other material.

References

Restorative dentistry